Pandit Ajoy Chakrabarty (born 25 December 1952) is an Hindustani classical vocalist, composer, lyricist and an exponent of the Patiala-Kasur gharana. He was given Padma Bhushan Award, the third highest civilian award in India in 2020.

Early life 
Ajoy Chakrabarty was born in Kolkata, West Bengal. He was raised with his brother in Shyamnagar. His younger brother, Sanjay Chakrabarty, is a lyricist and composer.

He graduated top of his class in music, both in B.A and M.A. from the Rabindra Bharati University in Kolkata and joined the ITC Sangeet Research Academy in 1978 as its first scholar. Today he is one of the youngest gurus of this academy.

His father, Ajit Chakrabarty, was his first Guru. He then studied with Pannalal Samanta, Kanaidas Bairagi and Jnan Prakash Ghosh.

Besides that, he had learnt from Latafat Hussain Khan, Nibruttibua Sarnaik, Hirabai Barodekar and in Carnatic styles from M. Balamuralikrishna, that kept enriching his musical expression and repertoire. Despite having such pure classical "taleem" in the Khyal genre, he also renders lighter forms such as Thumri, Tappa, Bhajan, Kirtan, Folk, Film/Non-Film and modern songs, in several different languages.

He has received several prestigious awards including the Padma Shri (2011), Sangeet Natak Akademi Award (Delhi, 1999–2000), Kumar Gandharva National Award  (1993) and the Best Male Playback Singer Award (Bengali Film "Chhandaneer" 1990) ("For bringing the rare depth of emotion, adorned by his command on the classical idiom") and National Tansen Samman 2015 - by the Chief Minister of Madhya Pradesh. He has also received felicitations from both the former and present Chief Ministers of his own State, West Bengal. In 2012, Chief Minister of West Bengal, Mamata Banerjee conferred him the Maha Sangeet Samman and the Banga Bibhushan, two of the State's highest awards. In 2015 he has received Guru Jnan Prakash Ghosh Lifetime Achievement Award.

He also was awarded honorary citizenship in New Orleans, after performing with jazz musicians at Preservation Hall, the birthplace of jazz music.

Singing career

He has been invited to perform in Pakistan and China and by BBC for their Golden Jubilee Celebration of India's Independence.

He has performed in some of the most prestigious venues around the world such as Carnegie Hall, The Kennedy Center, New Orleans Jazz Preservation Hall in the US, the Royal Albert hall and Queen Elizabeth Hall in the UK and Theatre de la Ville in France. In addition to that, Pandit Ajoy Chakrabarty performed at the Aga Khan Museum in Toronto, Canada in 2018 for the Raag-Mala Music Society of Toronto.

Inspired by the ideals of his Guru Jnan Prakash Ghosh, Chakrabarty founded Shrutinandan, a school of music.

Personal life
Chakrabarty is married to Chandana Chakraborty. His daughter, Kaushiki Chakraborty, is also a vocalist of Hindustani classical music. Their son, Ananjan Chakraborty, is a sound engineer.

Films

Awards

National Award – 1989
Kumar Gandharva Award – 1993
Sangeet Natak Akademi award – 2000
Padmashree – 2011
Banga Bibhushan – 2012
 Alva's Virasat Award – 2012
Tansen Samman - 2015
Pandit Omkarnath Thakur Shastriya Sangeet Award -  2014 - 2015
Padma Bhushan 2020

References

External links
Ajoy Chakrabarty Official Website
Ajoy Chakraborty in Asavari
Ajoy Chakraborty: Live on BBC
Ajoy Chakrabarty Biography and discussion forum

1952 births
Hindustani singers
Living people
Rabindra Bharati University alumni
Thumri
Recipients of the Padma Shri in arts
20th-century Indian singers
Singers from West Bengal
Indian male playback singers
21st-century Indian singers
Best Male Playback Singer National Film Award winners
Indian classical musicians of Bengal
Recipients of the Padma Bhushan in arts
Bengali Hindus
20th-century Khyal singers
20th-century Indian male singers
21st-century Indian male singers
Recipients of the Sangeet Natak Akademi Award